Anthony Geary (born May 29, 1947) is an American actor. He is known for playing the role of Luke Spencer on the ABC daytime drama General Hospital. He originated the role of Luke in 1978 and received a record eight Daytime Emmy Awards for Outstanding Lead Actor in a Drama Series prior to his retirement. Geary had a prominent supporting role in the "Weird Al" Yankovic comedy UHF (1989); other notable films include Johnny Got His Gun (1971), Disorderlies (1987), Scorchers (1991), Teacher's Pet (2004) and Fish Tank (2009).

Early life
Anthony Geary was born May 29, 1947, in Coalville, Utah, a son of a contractor father and homemaker mother.

Career
Geary made his first appearance on television in an episode of Room 222 and later appeared in All in the Family, The Mod Squad, Mannix, Marcus Welby, M.D., The Streets of San Francisco, and Barnaby Jones. Geary's first daytime role was in NBC soap opera Bright Promise from 1971 to 1972.

He played George Curtis, who was a rapist, in The Young and the Restless and in 1978 was hired for a 13-week story arc to play Luke Spencer in ABC soap General Hospital. Luke Spencer began as a hit man and later became a rapist who fell in love with and subsequently married his victim, Laura Webber (played by Genie Francis). His portrayal of Luke Spencer on General Hospital was well received and grew into a full contract role. The 1981 on-screen wedding of his character and Laura Webber holds the record as the highest-rated soap opera episode of all time.

He holds the distinction of winning a record eight Daytime Emmy Awards for Outstanding Lead Actor in a Drama Series. He was first nominated in 1980 and had his first win in 1982. Geary was nominated again in 1983, before leaving the show in 1984. Over the next several years he took roles in various theater and television productions, as well as in several films, but not at the level of success he had hoped for. Despite the popularity of his work as Luke Spencer, filmmakers such as Oliver Stone pigeonholed Geary based solely on the fact that he was a "soap actor". In a conscious effort to distance himself from General Hospital, he actively sought a role in "Weird Al" Yankovic's film debut UHF (1989), that of the quietly eccentric scientist Philo (named for television pioneer Philo Farnsworth). Geary, a fan of Yankovic, went so far as to grow his hair out like Albert Einstein's and stay in character as Philo when meeting the film's casting team; he immediately landed the role.

In 1991, Geary returned to General Hospital as Luke's cousin and look-alike Bill Eckert, due to the actor's desire to play someone other than Luke. However, due to poor feedback from the viewing public, the character was killed off and Geary resumed the role of Luke in 1993. Tony appeared in more than 50 stage plays, including an award-winning one-man show titled Human Scratchings in 1996. He was nominated in 1997 and 1998 for Daytime Emmys for Outstanding Lead Actor, and had his second win in 1999, and his third in 2000. He received another nomination in 2003, and had his fourth win in 2004. When Geary won for the fifth time in 2006, he set the record for the most lead actor wins. Geary received another Emmy nomination in 2007, and in 2008, he again set a record for most lead actor wins with his sixth Emmy for Outstanding Lead Actor.

Geary set a record in 2012 with his seventh Daytime Emmy win and again in 2015 for his eighth win for Outstanding Leading Actor in a Drama Series after 16 nominations for the same role of General Hospital's Luke Spencer. Geary publicly announced on Friday, May 8, 2015, that he would be leaving his role on General Hospital.  Geary finished taping his last scenes on the General Hospital set on June 23, 2015. His last air date was July 27, 2015. He later made a cameo appearance on a May 2017 episode to facilitate the retirement of co-star and former on-screen wife Tracy (played by Jane Elliot).

An exception to his series of dramatic roles is the part of a scientist/studio engineer in the comedy movie UHF. He also appeared in 1987's Disorderlies, with rappers the Fat Boys.

Filmography

Awards and nominations

References

External links

 

1947 births
Living people
Male actors from Utah
American male film actors
American male voice actors
American male television actors
American male soap opera actors
Daytime Emmy Award winners
Daytime Emmy Award for Outstanding Lead Actor in a Drama Series winners
People from Coalville, Utah
Latter Day Saints from Utah